WXCF is a classic hits and oldies broadcast radio station licensed to Clifton Forge, Virginia.  WXCF serves Clifton Forge and Covington.  WXCF is owned and operated by WVJT, LLC.

History
WXCF received its construction permit in December 1972 and applied for its license to broadcast on January 4, 1973.

The station went silent on January 18, 2012, citing a need for "significant repairs". The callsign WHTU was "parked" on the license for several weeks in November 2012 before it was put into use on the former WXCF-FM the following month. As the Telecommunications Act of 1996 mandates automatic deletion of any station that is continuously silent for one year, WXCF returned to the air in the afternoon of January 17, 2013.

In early 2016, WXCF switched from simulcasting WJVR to airing its own classic hits and oldies format.

WXCF is an affiliate of University of Virginia sports, including football, basketball, and Coaches’ shows throughout each season.

Translator
In addition to the main station, WXCF is relayed by an FM translator to widen its broadcast area.

Previous logo

References

External links
The Hits 107.5 FM Online

XCF
Classic hits radio stations in the United States
Oldies radio stations in the United States
Radio stations established in 1950